The field archery tournaments at the 2009 World Games in Kaohsiung was played between 24 and 26 July. 96 archers, from 20 nations, participated in the tournament. The archery competition took place at the Chengcing Lake.

Participating nations

Medal table

Events

Men's events

Women's events

References

External links
 World Archery
 Archery on IWGA website
 Results

 
2009 World Games
World Games